The Echo of Youth is a lost 1919 American silent drama film written and directed by Ivan Abramson, and featuring Charles Richman, Leah Baird, Pearl Shepard, and Marie Shotwell.

Plot
Cabaret singer Olive Martin (played by Baird) approaches her former lover Peter Graham (Richman), just recently elevated to the Supreme Court, about the fact that he is the father of her out-of-wedlock son.  To avoid exposing this scandal, Olive demands that Peter divorce his wife (played by Shotwell) and marry her.  Meanwhile, the alleged son, Harold (played by Jack McLean) is falling in love in Boston with Anita (Pearl Shepherd)—who is Peter's daughter with his wife.  News of their engagement and impending incestuous marriage requires Peter to divulge what he knows and forbid the marriage.  In typical Abramson fashion, however, it is revealed that Olive has lied about Harold being her son—instead he is the son of Olive's brother-in-law merely being used by Olive for blackmail! Peter's plan to commit suicide is successfully stopped, and the wedding free to proceed.

Cast
 Charles Richman as Peter Graham
 Leah Baird as Olive Martin
 Pearl Shepard as Anita Graham
 Jack McLean as Harold Martin
 William Bechtel as Thomas Donald
 Marie Shotwell as Ruth Carlyle Graham
 Howard Hall as John Carlyle
 Peggy Shanor as Marian Ducet
 Philip Van Loan as Marcel Ducet

Background
Released in February 1919, the film was the last picture Abramson directed for Graphic Film Corporation while it was a joint venture with William Randolph Hearst.  The reviews for the movie were negative, aside from those issued by Hearst's papers.  The Chicago Tribune, for example, called it "awful" and the "worst picture on the docket."

References

External links

The Echo of Youth at American Film Institute

1919 films
American black-and-white films
American silent feature films
Films directed by Ivan Abramson
Lost American films
Silent American drama films
1919 drama films
1919 lost films
Lost drama films
1910s American films